Jiangfang, may refer to:

 Jiangfang Township, Wutai County, a rural township in Wutai County, Shanxi, China.
 Jiangfang Township, Chengbu County, a rural township in Chengbu Miao Autonomous County, Hunan, China.